Siderolamprus montanus, the mountain lesser galliwasp, is a species of lizard of the Diploglossidae family. It is found in Honduras.

It was formerly classified in the genus Diploglossus, but was moved to Siderolamprus in 2021.

References

Siderolamprus
Reptiles described in 1933
Reptiles of Honduras
Endemic fauna of Honduras
Taxa named by Karl Patterson Schmidt